The Certification of Death (Scotland) Act 2011 is an Act of the Scottish Parliament relating to the certification of deaths in Scotland.

References 

Acts of the Scottish Parliament 2011